Project Runway: Fashion Startup was an eight-episode American reality television series that premiered on October 20, 2016 on Lifetime. This was the ninth direct spin-off series of another series, Project Runway, which airs on the same network. On Fashion Startup, aspiring fashion and beauty entrepreneurs were given the opportunity to pitch their business ideas to a panel of investors. The panel included Katia Beauchamp, CEO and cofounder of Birchbox; Christine Hunsicker, CEO and founder of Gwynnie Bee; Rebecca Minkoff, successful fashion designer with a global lifestyle brand; and Gary Wassner, CEO of Hilldun Corp. and chairman and cofounder of Interluxe Holdings, companies that have provided financing for some of America’s and the world’s designer labels.,

Episodes

Episode 1: Welcome to Fashion Startup 
Original airdate: October 20, 2016

Episode 2: This Is Called a Bidding War
Original airdate: October 27, 2016

Episode 3: Girls Just Wanna Have Funds!
Original airdate: November 3, 2016

Episode 4: I Need to See Focus
Original airdate: November 10, 2016

Episode 5: Where's All the Cash Going?
Original airdate: November 17, 2016

Episode 6: They're Ripping You Off
Original airdate: December 1, 2016

Episode 7: Entrepreneurs are the New Rock Stars
Original airdate: December 8, 2016

Episode 8: On Point
Original airdate: December 15, 2016

References

External links
 Project Runway: Fashion Startup Official Website
 

Project Runway (American series)
2010s American reality television series
2016 American television seasons
2016 American television series debuts
2016 American television series endings
2016 in fashion
American television spin-offs
English-language television shows
Lifetime (TV network) original programming
Reality television spin-offs
Television series by The Weinstein Company
Television series by Matador Content